Taningia fimbria is a recently described species of octopoteuthid squid from the genus Taningia. Like its better-known congener T. danae, T. fimbria is capable of achieving large sizes as adults; a recently examined specimen exceeded 1.65 m in mantle length. Like other members of the genus, T. fimbria lacks tentacles beyond small paralarval stages, has arms bearing two rows of sheathed hooks (instead of suckers), and bears large photophores at the tips of two arms. However, several unique characteristics separate the species from other species of Taningia. These include:

 lanceolate projections extending from the inner funnel aperture (unique character among known cephalopods)
 epidermal tubercles (a unique feature in the genus and family)
 modifications to arm hooks and arm morphology

See also
 Giant squid
 Giant squid in popular culture

References 

Squid
Molluscs described in 2019